Humfrey Tufton, 1st Baronet (1584 – October 1659) was an English politician who sat in the House of Commons  from 1640 to 1648.

Tufton was a son of John Tufton of Hothfield, and brother of Nicholas Tufton, 1st Earl of Thanet. He purchased The Mote near Maidstone.

Humfrey Tufton was involved in a duel with Murray of Prince Charles's bedchamber (a brother of Secretary Murray) in March 1625, after having an argument at a stage play. They went to St George's Fields to fight. Tufton noted the presence of Gibson, a Scottish armourer, although they had agreed not to have "seconds" present. Tufton objected and left the field. The events offended Gibson's sense of honour, and he fought with Murray. Both were fatally injured.

In November 1640, Tufton was elected Member of Parliament for Maidstone in the Long Parliament. He was created a baronet, of The Mote in the County of Kent, on 24 December 1641. He was excluded from parliament under Pride's Purge in 1648. He was appointed High Sheriff of Kent for 1654.

Tufton died at Bobbing Place at the age of 76.

Family
Tufton married Margaret Morley, daughter of Herbert Morley of Glynde Sussex.  He was succeeded in the baronetcy by his son, John. The title became extinct upon the death of the second Baronet in 1685. His daughter Olympia married Sir William Wray of Ashby.

References

1584 births
1659 deaths
English MPs 1640–1648
High Sheriffs of Kent
People from Maidstone
Place of birth missing
Baronets in the Baronetage of England